Deltatheridium (meaning triangle beast or delta beast) is an extinct species of metatherian. It lived in what is now Mongolia during the Upper Cretaceous, circa 80 million years ago. A study in 2022 strongly suggested that Deltatherium was a marsupial, making it the earliest known member of this group.

Its teeth indicate it was carnivorous. One specimen of Archaeornithoides might attest an attack by this mammal, the skull bearing tooth marks that match its teeth.

Other Mesozoic mammals from Mongolia 
Kamptobaatar
Zalambdalestes

References

Further reading 
 Parker, Steve. Dinosaurus: the complete guide to dinosaurs. Firefly Books Inc, 2003. Pg. 403
 

Prehistoric metatherians
Prehistoric mammal genera
Santonian life
Campanian life
Late Cretaceous mammals of Asia
Fossils of Kazakhstan
Fossils of Mongolia
Djadochta fauna
Transitional fossils
Fossil taxa described in 1926